Renato Mocellini (2 April 1929 – 8 November 1985) was an Italian bobsledder who competed from the mid-1950s to the mid-1960s. He won a silver medal in the four-man event at the 1956 Winter Olympics in Cortina d'Ampezzo.

Mocellini also won two medals in the four-man event at the FIBT World Championships with a gold in 1963 and a bronze in 1958.

References

External links
 
Bobsleigh four-man Olympic medalists for 1924, 1932-56, and since 1964
Bobsleigh four-man world championship medalists since 1930
DatabaseOlympics.com

1929 births
1985 deaths
Bobsledders at the 1956 Winter Olympics
Italian male bobsledders
Olympic bobsledders of Italy
Olympic silver medalists for Italy
Olympic medalists in bobsleigh
Medalists at the 1956 Winter Olympics
People from Vahrn
Sportspeople from Südtirol